Pungarehu is a small town located on Surf Highway 45 in Taranaki, New Zealand. Pungarehu is the home of the Cape Egmont Lighthouse, situated at Taranaki's westernmost point.

The town centre is located almost 5 km from the coast line.

Marae

The Parihaka Pa is located in Pungarehu, hosting the regular Parihaka Peace Festival. The town also hosts some small stores for the local dairy farmers.

Parāhuka Marae is a meeting place of the Taranaki hapū of Te Niho o Te Atiawa. In October 2020, the Government committed $478,243 from the Provincial Growth Fund to upgrade the marae, creating 6 jobs.

Takitūtū Marae and Te Paepae o Te Raukura meeting place is a meeting place of the Taranaki Iwi. In October 2020, the Government committed $359,146 towards refurbishing the marae, creating 6 jobs.

Pungarehu School

Pungarehu School was a primary school in Pungarehu. It held a consistent roll of around 50 students, and catered for years 1–8.

The school was forced to close in 2003, due to a review of the New Zealand school system by the Ministry of Education. The school buildings are still located on the corner of Cape Road and are yet to be used. Currently, the Pungarehu area is accessed by the bus routes of Coastal Taranaki School, Opunake Middle School and Rahotu Primary School.

References

South Taranaki District
Populated places in Taranaki
Parihaka